Bowning Creek, a mostlyperennial river that is part of the Murrumbidgee catchment in the Murray–Darling basin, is in the South West Slopes and Riverina regions of New South Wales, Australia.

Course 

The creek is crossed by the Hume Highway south of Bowning.

See also 

 List of rivers of New South Wales (A-K)
 Rivers of New South Wales

References

Rivers of New South Wales
Tributaries of the Murrumbidgee River
Rivers in the Riverina
Yass Valley Council